Lilia Igorevna Akhaimova (born 17 March 1997) is a retired Russian artistic gymnast. She represented the Russian Olympic Committee at the 2020 Summer Olympics and won a gold medal in the team event. She is a two-time World silver medalist with the Russian team (2018, 2019).

Personal life 
Lilia Akhaimova was born on 17 March 1997 in Vladivostok, Russian Far East, but she has resided with her parents in Saint Petersburg since August 2012. When she was five, her parents enrolled her in rhythmic gymnastics; when her coach advised her to go on probation, she chose artistic gymnastics. Akhaimova's younger sister, Lyubov also competed at the national level in artistic gymnastics. Akhaimova is of Jewish background.

Akhaimova studied sport and health at Lesgaft National State University of Physical Education in St. Petersburg.

In 2021, she received the title of Honoured Master of Sport in the Russian Federation.

Career

2015–16
In 2015 Akhaimova only competed at national competitions.  At the Russian national championships she placed 15th in the all-around and at the Russian Cup she finished 7th.  At the 2016 Russian national championships Akhaimova finished 12th.

2017
Akhaimova competed at the 2017 Summer Universiade, earning team gold, as well as the silver on vault and bronze on floor.

2018
On 20 July, Akhaimova was named to the Russian team to compete at the 2018 European Championships alongside Angelina Melnikova, Angelina Simakova, Irina Alexeeva, and Uliana Perebinosova. They won gold in the team final and individually Akhaimova placed fifth on vault.

On September 29, Akhaimova was named on the nominative team to compete at the 2018 World Championships in Doha, Qatar alongside Alexeeva, Melnikova, Aliya Mustafina, and Simakova. On October 17, the Worlds team was officially announced and was unchanged from the nominative team.

At Worlds, Akhaimova competed on vault and floor during the qualification rounds and was tasked with competing for the same two events during the team final. Despite crashing her Rudi vault in the final, Akhaimova rallied with a strong floor exercise to help Russia win the silver medal behind the United States and ahead of China.

Akhaimova also competed in the floor final, where she placed seventh.

2019
In July Akhaimova competed at the 2019 Summer Universiade alongside Tatiana Nabieva and Perebinosova.  In the team final, Akhaimova contributed scores on vault, beam, and floor, helping Russian win the silver behind Japan.  Individually Akhaimova won bronze in the all-around behind Hitomi Hatakeda of Japan and teammate Perebinosova. The following day, she won the silver medal on vault, behind Marina Nekrasova of Azerbaijan and just ahead of teammate Nabieva. Despite qualifying in first to the floor final, Akhaimova finished sixth in the final after counting a fall on her piked double Arabian. The Russians were the most decorated female artistic gymnastics team at the Universiade, winning eight medals. They were also the only team to win medals on every event.

In August Akhaimova competed at the Russian Cup.  After two days of competition she finished fourth in the all-around competition, behind Vladislava Urazova, Angelina Melnikova, and Elena Gerasimova.  On the first day of event finals Akhaimova won gold on vault, finishing ahead of Melnikova. On the second day of event finals she won bronze on floor exercise, finishing behind junior competitors Urazova and Gerasimova.  Shortly after the conclusion of the Russian Cup Akhaimova was named to the nominative team for the 2019 World Championships alongside Melnikova, Daria Spiridonova, Anastasia Agafonova, Angelina Simakova (later replaced by Maria Paseka), and Aleksandra Shchekoldina.

During qualifications she helped Russia qualify to the team final in third place behind the United States, and China.  Individually she qualified to the all-around, vault, and floor exercise finals.  Despite Valentina Rodionenko's, the head coach of the Russian Women's gymnastics team, low expectations for the team, they won the silver medal in the team final with Akhaimova contributing scores on three apparatuses.  During the all-around final Akhaimova fell numerous times and finished 22nd in the competition.

In November Akhaimova competed at Elite Gym Massilia where she placed fourth in the all-around and second on vault, behind Jennifer Gadirova of Great Britain.

2020 
In January it was announced that Akhaimova would represent Russia at the American Cup, taking place on March 7.  However, in late February Akhaimova and Nikita Nagornyy announced on Instagram that Russia withdrew from the upcoming competition due to the escalation of coronavirus worldwide.  In late September it was announced that Akhaimova would be competing at an upcoming competition in Hiroshima to take place in November alongside Angelina Melnikova, Elena Gerasimova, and Yana Vorona.  However she later withdrew due to a positive COVID-19 test.

2021 
Akhaimova competed at the Russian National Championships in March; however she withdrew from finals after sustaining a minor ankle injury.  She next competed at the Russian Cup in June.  During the all-around final she finished fourth behind Viktoria Listunova, Vladislava Urazova, and Angelina Melnikova.  Akhaimova placed first on vault and third on floor exercise.  Akhaimova was selected to represent the Russian Olympic Committee athletes at the 2020 Summer Olympics.  However it was undecided whether she would join Melnikova, Listunova, and Urazova on the four-person or compete as an individual.  In July it was decided that Akhaimova would be a part of the team and Elena Gerasimova would compete as an individual alongside Anastasia Ilyankova.

At the Olympic Games Akhaimova qualified to the vault event final.  Additionally she helped the Russian Olympic Committee qualify to the team final in a surprise first place, ahead of the United States team.  During the team final Akhaimova only competed on vault.  After the first rotation American team leader Simone Biles withdrew.  Although Melnikova and Urazova fell off the balance beam, the Russian team performed well on all other routines and finished in first place, over three points ahead of the second place American team.

2022 
Akhaimova announced her retirement from the sport in June.

Competitive history

International scores

See also
List of Jews in sports

References

External links
Russian Gymnastics Profile

1997 births
Living people
Russian female artistic gymnasts
Medalists at the World Artistic Gymnastics Championships
European champions in gymnastics
Universiade medalists in gymnastics
Universiade gold medalists for Russia
Universiade silver medalists for Russia
Universiade bronze medalists for Russia
Medalists at the 2017 Summer Universiade
Medalists at the 2019 Summer Universiade
Gymnasts from Saint Petersburg
Sportspeople from Vladivostok
Gymnasts at the 2020 Summer Olympics
Olympic medalists in gymnastics
Medalists at the 2020 Summer Olympics
Russian people of Jewish descent
Jewish gymnasts
Olympic gold medalists for the Russian Olympic Committee athletes